Underneath the Stars is the fourth studio album by English folk musician Kate Rusby, released on 11 August 2003 on Pure Records.

In a 2007 interview, Rusby noted that "The Blind Harper", which appears on this album, is her favourite traditional song.

Track listing
"The Good Man" (Kate Rusby/Traditional) - 4:31
"The Daughter of Megan" (Kate Rusby) - 3:53
"Let Me Be" (Kate Rusby/PF Sloan/Traditional) - 3:55
"Cruel" (Kate Rusby/Traditional) - 4:32 
"The Blind Harper" (Nic Jones/Traditional) - 4:07
"The White Cockade" (Traditional) - 4:42
"Young James" (Kate Rusby) - 4:49
"Falling" (Kate Rusby) - 4:37
"Bring Me a Boat" (Kate Rusby) - 5:29
"Polly" (Kate Rusby/Traditional) - 4:06
"Sweet William's Ghost" (Kate Rusby/Traditional) - 5:34
"Underneath the Stars" (Kate Rusby) - 3:20

Personnel
Kate Rusby - vocals, guitar
Ian Carr - guitar, mandolin
John McCusker - cittern, ukulele
Andy Cutting - diatonic accordion
Neil Yates - trumpet, flugelhorn
Ewen Vernal - double bass
James Macintosh - percussion, wee bells

References 

Kate Rusby albums
2003 albums

hu:Daydream#Underneath the Stars